Hassan Moalim was formally a member of the federal parliament of the Somali Federal Republic serving two terms and currently a Minister of Constitution and Justice under President Hassan Sheikh Mohamud. He hails from the Murusade sub-clan of the larger Hawiye clan. He is a graduate of the University of London School of Oriental and African Studies and is married with 6 children. He is also the current chairman and prospective presidential candidate of Daljir Party.

References

Somalian politicians
Living people
Year of birth missing (living people)